The San Diego Correctional Facility, also known as the Otay Mesa Detention Facility, is a minimum / medium security federal prison for men, managed by Corrections Corporation of America under contract with the United States Marshals Service and U.S. Immigration and Customs Enforcement (ICE).

The facility is situated in the San Ysidro Mountains foothills of Otay Mesa overlooking the U.S.-Mexico border.

The Otay Mesa site is shared with four other properties related to law enforcement:
 Richard J. Donovan Correctional Facility, operated by the California Department of Corrections and Rehabilitation.
 George Bailey County Detention facility, operated by the County of San Diego
 East Mesa Reentry Facility, operated by the City of San Diego
 Multi-jurisdictional law enforcement firearms training complex used by the FBI, the Customs Service, and local police forces.

References

Prisons in California
Buildings and structures in San Diego County, California
CoreCivic
Private prisons in the United States
San Ysidro Mountains